Pagliani is a surname. Notable people with the surname include:

 Manuel Pagliani (born 1996), Italian motorcycle racer
 Pericle Pagliani (1886–1932), Italian long-distance runner

See also
 Pagliani Vittoria, a single-seat glider built in Italy during Second World War
 Pagliarini